The Brisbane Cricket Ground, commonly known as the Gabba, is a major sports stadium in Brisbane, the capital of Queensland, Australia. The nickname Gabba derives from the suburb of Woolloongabba, in which it is located. Over the years, the Gabba has hosted athletics, Australian rules football, baseball, concerts, cricket, cycling, rugby league, rugby union, Association football and pony and greyhound racing. At present, it serves as the home ground for the Queensland Bulls in domestic cricket, the Brisbane Heat of the Big Bash League and Women's Big Bash League, and the Brisbane Lions of the Australian Football League. The Gabba will be the centrepiece of the 2032 Summer Olympics and will be upgraded for the games.

Between 1993 and 2005, the Gabba was redeveloped in six stages at a cost of A$128,000,000. The seating capacity of the ground was 42,000 in 2010, which has been reduced in recent times due to new electronic scoreboards and corporate facilities. For international cricket matches, the capacity is reduced to 36,000 due to new scoreboards and the addition of a pool deck, as well as wider sight screens. For AFL matches the capacity is slightly larger at 37,478. The capacity will increase to 50,000 for the 2032 Olympics.

History

Foundation

The land on which the ground sits was set aside for use as a cricket ground in 1895 and the first match was held on the site on 19 December 1896, between Parliament and The Press. Prior to this, cricket was played at a ground in the area then known as Green Hills (beside Countess Street Petrie Terrace opposite the Victoria Barracks – now occupied by the Northern Busway), since at least the early 1860s.

Greyhound racing meetings were held during 1928 at the ground.

The Gabba shared first-class cricket matches with the Exhibition Ground until 1931. The first Sheffield Shield match at the Gabba was scheduled to be played between 31 January 1931 and 4 February 1931, but it was washed out without a ball being bowled. The first Test match at the Gabba was played between Australia and South Africa between 27 November and 3 December 1931.

In 1972, a greyhound track was installed at The Gabba with night meetings held weekly at the ground for 21 years.

Expansion
From February 1993, work commenced on turning The Gabba into an all-seater stadium. The last greyhound meeting was held at The Gabba on 5 February 1993, with work commencing shortly after to remove the greyhound track around the ground to accommodate the relocation of the Brisbane Bears from Carrara (on the Gold Coast) to The Gabba, renovating the Sir Gordon Chalk Building to house the Bears Social Club and change rooms, refurbishing the Clem Jones stand (named for the long-standing Mayor of Brisbane, Clem Jones), the construction of a new Western grandstand, and extending the playing surface to cater for Australian rules football. 

The work was largely completed by 11 April when the Bears hosted their first AFL game at the renovated venue against Melbourne in front of 12,821 spectators. Subsequent further renovations at the ground saw the current two tier stands constructed in stages with the last stage completed in 2005 when the Brisbane Lions Social Club (formerly the Brisbane Bears Social Club) was demolished and replaced with a 24 bay grandstand spread over 3 levels of seating with the entire redevelopment costing $AU128 million. In mid-2020 the Gabba received a $35 million refurbishment of the stadium's media and corporate facilities, as well as entrances and spectator amenities. The work was completed in October that year, shortly before the venue hosted the 2020 AFL Grand Final.

2032 Summer Olympics
After Brisbane was awarded the rights to host the 2032 Summer Olympics by the International Olympic Committee, the Queensland Government announced the Gabba would be the central venue used for the Games. The government has proposed demolishing the stadium's foundations and rebuilding the Gabba with new grandstands in its place, which would seat approximately 50,000 spectators. The cost of the proposal is $1 billion. The venue will be used for Athletics along with the Opening and Closing ceremonies.

Sports played at the ground

Cricket

The First Test between Australia and England is played nowadays at Brisbane. Nobody seems to know why, and all sorts of arguments are ventilated for and against more cricket Tests on the Woolloongabba ground. I am all in favour of robbing Queensland of its greatest cricketing occasion, for the ground depresses. It is not a cricket ground at all. It is a concentration camp! Wire fences abound. Spectators are herded and sorted out into lots as though for all the world this was a slave market and not a game of cricket. The stands are of wood and filthy to sit on. The dining rooms are barns, without a touch of colour or a picture on the wall. Everywhere there is dust and dirt...Forgive me if I am bitter about the Woolloongabba ground...the city has many good points, and the people who live there are generous and hospitable to the highest degree, but once one goes to the cricket ground the advantages are overwhelmingly lost in the mass of rules and regulations... – John Kay, 1950–51 Ashes series
The Gabba is used from October to March for cricket and is home to the Queensland Cricket Association, the Queensland Cricketers Club and the Queensland Bulls cricket team. The venue usually hosts the first Test match of the season each November in addition to a number of international one-day matches usually held in January. The pitch is usually fast and bouncy.

The Gabba's amenities were greatly improved in the 1980s from a very basic standard, especially in comparison with the other Australian cricket grounds. Test cricket was first played at the ground in November 1931, the first Test of the series between Australia and South Africa. In December 1960, Test cricket's first-ever Tied Test took place at the ground when Richie Benaud's Australian team tied with Frank Worrell's West Indian side. Queensland clinched its first-ever Sheffield Shield title with victory over South Australia in the final at the ground in March 1995.

The Gabba was the first Australian venue to host an International Twenty20 cricket match.

In November 1968 Colin Milburn scored 243, including 181 in the two-hour afternoon session, in a Sheffield Shield match for Western Australia vs. Queensland.

For the first day of the first Test of the 2010–11 Ashes series between Australia and England, the Gabba was almost sold out.
Australia's Michael Clarke holds the record for number of runs scored in one Test innings at the Gabba with 259 not out, breaking the previous record set by Alastair Cook.

Australia has a formidable test match record at the ground. In the 55 matches played at the ground, Australia has won 33, drawn 13, tied 1 and lost 9. The last loss came on 19 January 2021 against India in the 4th and final test of 2020-21 Border-Gavaskar trophy. India became the first Asian team to win a Test match at the Gabba. This was Australia's first loss at the Gabba in 29 matches, and 32 years. 
England have a notoriously poor record at The Gabba, and have only won two test matches at the ground since the end of the Second World War. Many of their defeats have been heavy and only seven England players have scored centuries at the ground.

On 15 December 2016, Australia hosted Pakistan for the first day-night Test at the Gabba, and the first Australian day-night Test hosted outside the Adelaide Oval.

Australian rules football

The first VFL/AFL game at The Gabba was held on June 28, 1981 with  hosting  in front of 20,351 spectators. Six years later, the Brisbane Bears were admitted into the VFL but would initially play their home games at Carrara Stadium on the Gold Coast. The Brisbane Bears experimented with playing four matches at the Gabba in Brisbane in 1991, before moving all home matches to the venue ahead of the 1993 season. The Gabba was then the official home ground for the Brisbane Bears from 1993 to 1996 and since 1997 has been the home of the Brisbane Lions after the Bears merged with Fitzroy. The record crowd for an Australian rules football match is 37,473 between the Brisbane Lions and Richmond in the 2019 second qualifying final.

Australian football has a long association with the ground. The Queensland Football League, a precursor to AFL Queensland played matches at the Gabba from 1905 to 1914, 1959 to 1971, and in the late 1970s and early 1980s. AFLQ matches resumed in 1993 as curtain-raiser events to AFL games, along with occasional AFLQ Grand Finals.

Interstate games, including the 1961 national carnival have also been played there, as was a demonstration game during the 1982 Commonwealth Games. In 1991 the Gabba was host to Queensland's only victory over a Victorian side.

The Gold Coast Suns have hosted games at the Gabba in 2011 and in 2018 due to the unavailability of their home ground Carrara Stadium because of redevelopment and the 2018 Commonwealth Games respectively.

During the 2020 AFL season, the Gabba hosted a greater number of home and away matches than usual, due to the temporary relocation of Victorian and other clubs as a result of the COVID-19 pandemic. The venue was also selected to host the 2020 AFL Grand Final, with the Melbourne Cricket Ground not capable of hosting any spectators at the match. The Gabba thus became the first stadium outside the state of Victoria to host a VFL/AFL Grand Final, which Richmond won against Geelong by 12.9 (81) to 7.8 (50) in front of 29,707 people – just under the venue's temporary maximum capacity due to the pandemic. Since the MCG began hosting VFL/AFL Grand Finals (VFL until 1989, AFL afterwards), only four other venues had done so: Princes Park (1942, 1943 and 1945), the St Kilda Cricket Ground (1944), Waverley Park (1991), and Optus Stadium (2021).

Soccer
In the early 1900s, the Gabba hosted numerous matches between Australia and various touring nations. During the 1950s and 1960s the Gabba hosted soccer matches for English first division and Scottish clubs including Blackpool FC, Everton FC, Manchester United and Heart of Midlothian F.C. The Chinese and South African national teams also played at the ground. During the 2000 Summer Olympics, the Gabba hosted association football group games.

Rugby league
On 8 May 1909, the first match of rugby league was played in Brisbane at the Gabba. Norths played against Souths before a handful of spectators at the ground.
The Gabba hosted its first rugby league Test match on 26 June 1909, when Australia defeated New Zealand Māori 16–13. 

The Queensland Rugby league team hosted a match of the 1953 American All Stars tour of Australia and New Zealand at the Brisbane Cricket Ground.

The Kangaroos continued to play Tests at this venue until 1956, and a ground record crowd of 47,800 people saw Australia play Great Britain in 1954. From 1932 to 1959 the Gabba was also used to host interstate matches and International Rugby League Finals from 1909 – 2003.

In 2023, The Gabba will play host to three Brisbane Broncos matches while their regular home ground Suncorp Stadium is unavailable due to the 2023 FIFA Women's World Cup.

Rugby league test matches
The Gabba hosted 11 rugby league test matches between 1912 and 1956.

Rugby union
The Gabba has hosted six rugby union Test matches.

2000 Olympic Games
The Gabba hosted seven games of the 2000 Olympic Games Men's Football tournament including a Quarter final match.

Greyhound racing
Greyhound racing was also conducted at the Gabba prior to the redevelopment. Meetings were held during 1928 and again from 1972 until 1993.

Awards
In 2009, as part of the Q150 celebrations, the Gabba was announced as one of the Q150 Icons of Queensland for its role as a "structure and engineering feat".

Largest crowds at the Gabba

Test cricket records

Batting

Bowling 

Note: best innings figures limited to 10; there have actually been 27 six-wicket innings hauls at the Gabba.

Team records

Partnership records 

All records correct as of 23 December 2022.

VFL/AFL records

Player records

Team records 

 Highest score:  33.21 (219) defeated  8.9 (57), 16 May 1993
 Lowest score:  3.8 (26) defeated by  4.10 (34), 12 July 2020
 Biggest margin:  defeated , 162 points, 16 May 1993

Last updated: 1 October 2022.

See also

List of Australian Football League grounds
List of Big Bash League venues
List of cricket grounds in Australia
List of Oceanian stadiums by capacity
List of sports venues in Australia
List of Test cricket grounds

References

 History of the Gabba
AFL Capacity
 Overview of Information about the Gabba 
 Brisbane Lions information

External links

 Brisbane Cricket Ground – Queensland Government Legislation Act, 1993 (.pdf file)
 Brisbane Cricket Ground – Statistical Overview (Test Cricket) – HowSTAT! Grounds Statistics
 
 
 
 Woolloongabba Cultural Mapping Oral History. State Library of Queensland (includes Clem Jones recalling his involvement in cricket at the Gabba)
 Satellite photo of the Gabba
 Brisbane Lions
 World Stadiums 

Australian Football League grounds
Brisbane Lions
Sports venues in Brisbane
Test cricket grounds in Australia
Rugby League World Cup stadiums
Venues of the 2000 Summer Olympics
Venues of the 2032 Summer Olympics and Paralympics
Olympic athletics venues
Olympic football venues
Defunct greyhound racing venues in Australia
Culture of Brisbane
History of Brisbane
Rugby union stadiums in Australia
Multi-purpose stadiums in Australia
1895 establishments in Australia
Gold Coast Suns
Woolloongabba
Sports venues completed in 1895
2015 Cricket World Cup stadiums
Women's Big Bash League
North East Australian Football League grounds
1992 Cricket World Cup stadiums
Q150 Icons
Music venues in Australia
Cricket grounds in Queensland